Porphyry (Porphyrios "purple-clad") may refer to:

Geology
 Porphyry (geology), an igneous rock with large crystals in a fine-grained matrix, often purple, and prestigous Roman sculpture material 
 Porphyritic, the general igneous texture of a rock with two distinct crystal (phenocryst) sizes
 Porphyry copper deposit, a primary (low grade) ore deposit of copper, consisting of porphyry rocks
 Porphyrian tree, classic device for illustrating hierarchy and ontology

Places 

Mons Porphyrites, the only porphyry quarry worked in the ancient world for the emperor's building works and statuary 
Porphyry Island in Lake Superior, Canada 
 Porphyry Mountain in Alaska, Unites States
 Porphyry, a system of astrological house division
 Porphyry, a vineyard near Seaham, New South Wales, Australia

Animals and plants 

 Porphyra, a foliose red algal genus of laver
 Oliva porphyria, a species of sea snail
 Porphyrio, the swamphens, a genus of birds in the rail family
 Porphyrios (whale), a 6th-century whale

People 
 Porphyry (philosopher) (234–305), Neoplatonic philosopher
 Porphyry of Gaza (or "Saint Porphyrius", 347–420), Bishop of Gaza
 Porfirije, Serbian Patriarch (b. 1961), 46th Patriarch of the Serbian Orthodox Church
 Porphyrio, also known as Pomponius Porphyrion, a Latin grammarian, fl. 2nd or 3rd century
 Porphyrion, a giant in Greek mythology
 Porphyrius the Charioteer, Roman charioteer in the 5th and 6th centuries AD
 Demetri Porphyrios, greek new classical architect, founder of Porphyrios Associates
 Porphyrios Dikaios, greek cypriot archaeologist 
 Porphyrios of Kafsokalyvia, greek athonite hieromonk and eastern orthodox saint
 Publilius Optatianus Porfyrius, Latin poet

See also 
 Born in the purple, Porphyrogénnētos , Byzantine term for the children of emperors, after a supposed porphry-lined birthing room in the palace 
 
 Porfirio (disambiguation), various uses, including a Spanish surname
 Porfiry, a Russian given name
 Tyrian purple or Porphyra, a purple-red natural dye
 "Porphyria's Lover", originally published as "Porphyria", a poem by Robert Browning
 Porphyria, a disease giving purple urine
 Porphyrins, a group of organic compounds